The Parliamentary Select Committees of Malaysia are sub-legislative bodies each consisting of small number of Members of Parliament (MPs) from the House of Representatives, or senators from the Senate, or a mix of both appointed to deal with particular areas or issues; most are made up of members of the Representatives. appointed to deal with particular areas or issues. The majority of parliamentary committees are Select committees. It was first announced in August 2018 by Mohamad Ariff Md Yusof, Speaker of the House of Representatives, that six new parliamentary select committees will be established, before later announcing in April 2019 a massive reformation of the Malaysian parliamentary institution with a further planned eleven new select committees, each focusing on particular ministries or governmental agencies. Prior to the 14th session of parliament, only five permanent and two temporary committees had been in operation. The remit of these committees vary depending on whether they are committees of the House of Representatives or the Senate.

The creation of four new select committees were announced by the Minister in the Prime Minister's Department in charge of legal affairs, Liew Vui Keong, on 17 October 2019.

House of Representatives

Select Committees 
Departmental (Dept) select committees are designed to oversee and examine the work of individual government departments and any related departmental bodies and agencies.
Topical select committees examine topical issues of importance.
Internal select committees have responsibility with respect to the day-to-day running of Parliament.

Caucus Committees

Senate

Internal 
 House Committee
 Committee of Privileges
 Committee of Selection
 Standing Orders Committee

Former committees

Representatives 
Select Committee On Lynas Advanced Materials Plant (LAMP) - abolished 20 June 2012 following expiration of three-month time frame

Notes

References

External links 
Committees of the Malaysian House of Representatives
Committees of the Malaysian Senate
Public Accounts Committee of Malaysia
COMMITTEE OF SELECTION - HOUSE OF REPRESENTATIVES
STANDING ORDERS COMMITTEE - HOUSE OF REPRESENTATIVES
HOUSE COMMITTEE - HOUSE OF REPRESENTATIVES
THE COMMITTEE OF PRIVILEGES - HOUSE OF REPRESENTATIVES
ARCHIVES SPECIAL SELECT COMMITTEE
SPECIAL SELECT COMMITTEE ON ELECTORAL REFORM
SPECIAL SELECT COMMITTEE ON LYNAS ADVANCED MATERIALS PLANT (LAMP)
COMMITTEE OF SELECTION - SENATE
HOUSE COMMITTEE - SENATE
COMMITTEE OF PRIVILEGES - SENATE
STANDING ORDERS COMMITTEE - SENATE

Parliament of Malaysia